Revolution Ice Rink (Spanish: Pista Revolución) was an indoor arena located in Mexico City. The rink hosted some of the volleyball competitions for the 1968 Summer Olympics.

The arena also hosted a number of wrestling events. It was demolished in 1997. During demolition, the roof unexpectedly caved in, injuring several workers.

Today, the arena's site is occupied by a gas station.

References

External links

1968 Summer Olympics official report. Volume 2. Part 1. p. 78.

Venues of the 1968 Summer Olympics
Olympic volleyball venues
Indoor arenas in Mexico
Sports venues in Mexico City
Sports venues demolished in 1997
Demolished buildings and structures in Mexico
Defunct sports venues in Mexico
Defunct indoor arenas